David Newlin Fell (November 4, 1840 – September 22, 1919) served as a justice of the Supreme Court of Pennsylvania from 1894 to 1910, and as chief justice from 1910 to 1915.

Biography
D. Newlin Fell was born on November 4, 1840, in Buckingham Township, Bucks County, Pennsylvania, to Joseph C. Fell and Harriet Williams. He attended [Millersville State Normal School (now Millersville University)] and graduated in 1862. Subsequently, Fell served in the Union Army during the American Civil War, first as 2nd lieutenant of Co. E, 122nd Pennsylvania Infantry, from August 12, 1862, through May 15, 1863, and then during July through August 1863 as 1st lieutenant of Company D, 31st Pennsylvania Militia Regiment. He married Martha Trego on September 1, 1870, and had seven children with her.

Fell served as an Associate Judge on the Philadelphia Court of Common Pleas, having been appointed in May 1877. Fell was elected to the Supreme Court of Pennsylvania in November 1893. He assumed office in 1894 and served as an associate justice until 1910, when he was elevated to chief justice. He served as chief justice until 1915. Fell died on September 22, 1919.

Fell held an honorary LL.D. from Swarthmore College, awarded in 1911, and he is the namesake of the D. Newlin Fell School.

References

1840 births
1919 deaths
People from Bucks County, Pennsylvania
Justices of the Supreme Court of Pennsylvania
Millersville University of Pennsylvania alumni
Pennsylvania lawyers
Union Army soldiers
19th-century American judges
19th-century American lawyers